Venancio da Silva Moura (February 24, 1942 – March 6, 1999) was the Minister of External Relations of Angola from 1992 until a government reshuffle in January 1999 shortly before his death. Born in Uíge Province, he earned a law degree in Portugal. After Angola's independence, he served in the MPLA diplomatic corps. In 1994, he signed the Lusaka Protocol on behalf the Angolan government.

See also 
List of foreign ministers in 1999 
Foreign relations of Andorra

References

External links

1942 births
1999 deaths
Foreign ministers of Angola
Angolan diplomats